In group theory, Tietze transformations are used to transform a given presentation of a group into another, often simpler presentation of the same group.  These transformations are named after Heinrich Franz Friedrich Tietze who introduced them in a paper in 1908.

A presentation is in terms of generators and relations; formally speaking the presentation is a pair of a set of named generators, and a set of words in the free group on the generators that are taken to be the relations. Tietze transformations are built up of elementary steps, each of which individually rather evidently takes the presentation to a presentation of an isomorphic group. These elementary steps may operate on generators or relations, and are of four kinds.

Adding a relation
If a relation can be derived from the existing relations then it may be added to the presentation without changing the group.  Let G=〈 x | x3=1 〉 be a finite presentation for the cyclic group of order 3.  Multiplying x3=1 on both sides by x3 we get x6 =  x3 = 1 so x6 = 1 is derivable from x3=1.  Hence G=〈 x | x3=1, x6=1 〉 is another presentation for the same group.

Removing a relation
If a relation in a presentation can be derived from the other relations then it can be removed from the presentation without affecting the group.  In G = 〈 x | x3 = 1, x6 = 1 〉 the relation x6 = 1 can be derived from x3 = 1 so it can be safely removed.  Note, however, that if x3 = 1 is removed from the presentation the group G = 〈 x | x6 = 1 〉 defines the cyclic group of order 6 and does not define the same group.  Care must be taken to show that any relations that are removed are consequences of the other relations.

Adding a generator
Given a presentation it is possible to add a new generator that is expressed as a word in the original generators.  Starting with G = 〈 x | x3 = 1 〉 and letting y = x2 the new presentation G = 〈 x,y | x3 = 1, y = x2 〉 defines the same group.

Removing a generator
If a relation can be formed where one of the generators is a word in the other generators then that generator may be removed.  In order to do this it is necessary to replace all occurrences of the removed generator with its equivalent word.  The presentation for the elementary abelian group of order 4, G=〈 x,y,z | x = yz, y2=1, z2=1, x=x−1 〉 can be replaced by G = 〈 y,z | y2 = 1, z2 = 1, (yz) = (yz)−1 〉 by removing x.

Examples 
Let G = 〈 x,y | x3 = 1, y2 = 1, (xy)2 = 1 〉 be a presentation for the symmetric group of degree three.  The generator x corresponds to the permutation (1,2,3) and y to (2,3).  Through Tietze transformations this presentation can be converted to G = 〈 y, z | (zy)3 = 1, y2 = 1, z2 = 1 〉, where z corresponds to (1,2).

See also

 Nielsen Transformation
 Andrews-Curtis Conjecture

References
 Roger C. Lyndon, Paul E. Schupp, Combinatorial Group Theory, Springer, 2001. .

Combinatorial group theory